Pakorn P.K. Saenchai Muaythaigym is a Thai Muay Thai kickboxer, originally from the Phra Samut Chedi District, but now fighting out of Bangkok, Thailand. Pakorn is a former 135 lbs. Lumpinee Stadium champion and 65 kg Yokkao champion. He is the former 115 lbs Rajadamnern Stadium champion and is currently ranked nr. 1 at 135bs. He holds wins over fighters such as Sagetdao Petpayathai, Jomthong Chuwattana, Nong-O Kaiyanghadaogym, Pornsanae Sitmonchai and Kongsak Sitboonmee.

Career

Muay Thai 
Pakorn started training at the age of 9 and had his first fight a few months later, winning by decision. His father is a Muay Thai enthusiast and trained Pakorn until he joined the Sitphateang camp. Pakorn's first camp in Bangkok was Sakyothin, moving to Jitti Gym for a year and finally joining former opponent Saenchai PKSaenchaimuaythaigym's camp at the 13 Coins resort. Pakorn subsequently moved with Saenchai to the PK Saenchai Muay Thai Gym in Bangkok before joining Evolve MMA in October 2016.

In 2008, Pakorn won the Rajadamnern Stadium 115 lbs. title by beating Khaimukdam Chuwattana. In 2010, Pakorn fought Pornsanae Sitmonchai twice, once at Lumpinee Stadium and once at Rajadamnern Stadium, besting the aggressive former Rajadamnern Stadium champion on both occasions. Pakorn took on future Lumpinee Stadium champion Yodwicha Por Boonsit in 2012, with the fight ending in a draw. That same year he fought living legend and future teammate Saenchai PKSaenchaimuaythaigym in Glasgow, Scotland in what was Pakorn's first fight outside of Thailand. He lost the fight by decision after five rounds.

On December 5, 2013, Pakorn fought Kongsak Sitboonmee for the Thailand lightweight 135 lbs. title, winning the fight by decision. Three months later, on February 28, 2014, he took on Singdam Kiatmoo9 for the Lumpinee Stadium lightweight 135 lbs. title. Pakorn won the fight by decision. On June 14, 2014, Pakorn defeated Yetkin Özkul at Monte Carlo Fight Masters to win the WMC World Lightweight (-61.2 kg/135 lb) Championship. He defended his Lumpinee title on September 5, 2014, against Sagetdao Petpayathai, also winning this fight by decision. At Yokkao 11, held on October 11, 2014, Pakorn beat Englishman Greg Wootton for the promotion's -65 kg world title. Pakorn won the fight by decision after five rounds.

On 22 August 2017, YOKKAO Boxing announced that Pakorn would fight under the new name, Pakorn P.K. YOKKAO Saenchai Gym. He is currently under YOKKAO management and trains at the YOKKAO Training Center in Bangkok.

In April 2022 it was announced that Pakorn moved to Japan to become a Muay Thai trainer at Eiwa Sports Gym in Yokohama.

Lethwei 
On December 29, 2019, in a very anticipated matchup, Pakorn faced multiple-times Lethwei World Champion, Soe Lin Oo under traditional Lethwei rules in Hpa-an, Karen state, Myanmar. Pakorn was cautious in the clinch to avoid the headbutts of the Burmese. In Round 4, while in the clinch, Soe Lin Oo floored Pakorn with a headbutt knockout and he was not able to continue.

Titles and accomplishments
Sports Authority of Thailand
 2013 Sports Authority of Thailand Fighter of the Year
World Professional Muaythai Federation
 2022 WPMF World Welterweight Champion

Battle of MuayThai
 2022 BoM Welterweight Champion

Phoenix Fighting Championship
2017 Phoenix Fighting Champion

Thairath TV
2016 ThairathTV's 147 lbs Champion

World Kickboxing Union
2016 WKU 67 kg World Champion

YOKKAO
2014 Yokkao -65 kg World Champion

World Muaythai Council
2014  WMC World 135 lbs. Champion

Lumpinee Stadium
2014 Lumpinee Stadium 135 lbs. Champion (2 defenses)

Professional Boxing Association of Thailand (PAT)
2013 Thailand (PAT) 135 lbs. Champion

Rajadamnern Stadium
2008 Rajadamnern Stadium 115 lbs. Champion

Muay Thai record 

|- style="background:#cfc;"
| 2023-03-12 ||Win ||align=left| Hayato Suzuki || K-1 World GP 2023: K'Festa 6 || Tokyo, Japan || Decision (Majority) || 3 ||3:00
|-  style="background:#cfc;"
| 2022-09-23|| Win || align=left| Yukimitsu Takahashi ||  The Battle of Muay Thai "OUROBOROS" || Tokyo, Japan || Decision || 5 || 3:00 ||
|-
! style=background:white colspan=9 |
|-  style="background:#cfc;"
| 2022-02-26 || Win ||align=left| Walid Otmane || Muay Thai Fighter X || Hua Hin, Thailand || Decision || 5 || 3:00 ||
|-  style="background:#cfc;"
| 2020-10-18 || Win ||align=left| Ahmed Badat || Thai Channel 8 Muay Thai Super Champ || Bangkok, Thailand || KO (Overhand Right) || 2 ||  ||
|-  style="background:#cfc;"
| 2020-08-15 || Win ||align=left| Yanis Mazouni || Thai Channel 8 Muay Hardcore || Bangkok, Thailand || KO (Left Hook) || 1 || 0:44 ||
|- style="background:#fbb;"
| 2020-02-23 ||Loss||align=left| Rafi Bohic || Authentic Mix Martial Arts || Phuket, Thailand || Decision || 3 || 3:00 ||
|-  style="background:#cfc;"
| 2019-12-15|| Win ||align=left| Anthonie Frank|| MX MUAY XTREME || Bangkok, Thailand || Decision (Unanimous) || 3 || 3:00 ||
|-  style="background:#fbb;"
| 2019-11-02|| Loss|| align="left" | Julio Lobo || Maximum Muay Thai Fight || Brazil, São Paulo || Decision || 5 || 3:00 ||
|- style="background:#cfc;"
| 2019-06-01|| Win || align="left" | Yoshimichi Matsumoto || The Battle Of MuayThai SEASON II vol.2 ||Yokohama, Japan || Decision || 5 || 3:00||
|- style="background:#cfc;"
| 2019-04-14|| Win || align="left" | Ryota Nakano || The Battle Of MuayThai SEASON II vol.1 ||Yokohama, Japan || KO (Low kick) || 2 || ||
|- style="background:#cfc;"
| 2019-01-27|| Win || align="left" | Victor Conesa || All Star Fight ||Thailand || Decision  || 3 || 3:00||
|- style="background:#cfc;"
| 2018-12-22|| Win || align="left" | Aleksei Ulianov || Muaythai Factory||Russia || Decision (Unanimous) || 5 || 3:00||
|- style="background:#cfc;"
| 2018-11-04|| Win || align="left" | Will Romero || All Star Fight||Thailand || Decision || 3 || 3:00||
|-
|-  style="background:#cfc;"
| 2018-07-01|| Win || align="left" | Naimjon Tuhtaboyev || 8 Super Champ || Thailand ||Decision || 3 || 3:00 ||
|-  style="background:#fbb;"
| 2018-05-12|| Loss ||align=left| Satanfah Rachanon  || THAI FIGHT Samui 2018 || Ko Samui, Thailand || Decision || 3 || 3:00  ||
|-  style="background:#cfc;"
| 2018-03-24|| Win || align="left" | Noe Monteiro || THAI FIGHT Mueang Khon 2018 || Nakhon Si Thammarat, Thailand || KO (Right Hook) || 1 ||  ||
|-  style="background:#cfc;"
| 2017-09-30|| Win || align="left" | Igor Liubchenko || All-Star Fight 2 || Bangkok, Thailand || Decision || 3 || 3:00 ||
|-  style="background:#cfc;"
| 2017-08-20|| Win || align="left" | Julio Lobo || All-Star Fight || Bangkok, Thailand || Decision || 3 || 3:00 ||
|-  style="background:#cfc;"
| 2017-04-29|| Win ||align=left| Morgan Adrar  || Phoenix Fighting Championship || Lebanon || Decision || 5 || 3:00 ||
|-
! style=background:white colspan=9 |
|-  style="background:#fbb;"
| 2016-12-23|| Loss ||align=left| Chadd Collins || MX MUAY XTREME || Bangkok, Thailand || Decision || 5 || 3:00 || 
|-  style="background:#cfc;"
| 2016-11-25|| Win ||align=left| Bakhodirjon Bhoabdukodir|| MX MUAY XTREME || Bangkok, Thailand || Decision (Unanimous) || 3 || 3:00 ||
|-  style="background:#cfc;"
| 2016-10-22|| Win ||align=left| Rayan Mekki|| La Nuit Des Challenges 16 || France || Decision || 3 || 3:00 ||
|-  style="background:#cfc;"
| 2016-07-09|| Win ||align=left| Indrachai Chor.Haphayak|| Yodmuay Thairath TV || Bangkok, Thailand || Decision || 5 || 3:00 ||
|-
! style=background:white colspan=9 |
|-  style="background:#cfc;"
| 2016-06-19|| Win||align=left| Marco Novak  || Hanuman Cup 31|| Slovakia || Decision || 5 || 3:00 ||
|-
! style=background:white colspan=9 |
|-  style="background:#cfc;"
| 2016-04-02|| Win||align=left| Khaiwhanlek Tor Lhuksong || Yodmuay Thairath TV || Bangkok, Thailand || Decision || 5 || 3:00 ||
|-  style="background:#cfc;"
| 2016-03-05|| Win||align=left| Jin Ying || Wu Lin Feng || China || Decision || 3 || 3.00 ||
|-  style="background:#fbb;"
| 2016-02-20|| Loss ||align=left| Littewada Sitthikul || Siam Warriors || Ireland || Decision || 5 || 3:00 || 
|-  style="background:#fbb;"
| 2016-01-23|| Loss ||align=left| Wei Rui || Wu Lin Feng 2016: World Kickboxing Championship in Shanghai || Shanghai, China || Decision || 3 || 3.00 ||
|-
|-  style="background:#fbb;"
| 2015-12-27|| Loss ||align=left| Tetsuya Yamato || Hoost Cup Kings Nagoya || Nagoya, Japan || Decision || 5 || 3:00 || 
|-  style="background:#fbb;"
| 2015-12-05|| Loss ||align=left| Wei Rui || Wu Lin Feng World Championship 2015 – 63 kg Tournament, Semi Finals || Zhengzhou, China || Decision || 3 || 3.00 ||
|-  style="background:#cfc;"
| 2015-11-13 || Win ||align=left| Nicolas Vega|| Yokkao 16 || Argentina || Decision || 3 || 3:00 ||
|-  style="background:#cfc;"
| 2015-10-03 || Win ||align=left| Aleksei Ulianov|| Xtreme Muay Thai 2015 || Macao || Decision || 5 || 3:00 ||
|-  style="background:#cfc;"
| 2015-09-05 || Win ||align=left| Wang Wankun|| Wu Lin Feng World Championship 2015 – 63 kg Tournament, Quarter Finals || Guangzhou, China || Decision || 3 || 3:00 ||
|-
|-  style="background:#cfc;"
| 2015-09-05 || Win ||align=left| Wang Zhiwei|| Wu Lin Feng World Championship 2015 – 63 kg Tournament, First Round || Guangzhou, China || Decision || 3 || 3:00 ||
|-
|-  style="background:#cfc;"
| 2015-07-28 || Win ||align=left| Dmitry Varats|| TopKing World Series 4 || Hongkong, China || Decision || 3 || 3:00 ||
|-
|-  style="background:#cfc;"
| 2015-07-02 || Win ||align=left| Denpanom Ror Kilakorat || Rajadamnern Stadium || Bangkok, Thailand || Decision || 5 || 3:00 ||
|-
|-  style="background:#cfc;"
| 2015-03-21|| Win ||align=left| Liam Harrison || Yokkao 13 || Bolton, England || Unanimous Decision || 5 || 3:00 ||
|-
! style=background:white colspan=9 |
|-  style="background:#cfc;"
| 2015-01-08|| Win ||align=left| Auisiewpor Sujibamikiew|| Rajadamnern Stadium || Bangkok, Thailand || Decision || 5 || 3:00 || 
|-  style="background:#cfc;"
| 2014-12-09|| Win ||align=left| Parnpetch Kiatjaroenchai || Lumpinee Stadium || Bangkok, Thailand || Decision || 5 || 3:00 || 
|-
! style=background:white colspan=9 | 
|-
|-  style="background:#cfc;"
| 2014-11-01 || Win ||align=left| Jimmy Vienot || Top King Muay Thai || Belarus || KO (Punch) || 1 ||  || 
|-  style="background:#cfc;"
| 2014-10-26 || Win ||align=left| Yasuyuki || REBELS || Japan || Decision || 5 || 3:00 || 
|-  style="background:#cfc;"
| 2014-10-11 || Win ||align=left| Greg Wootton || Yokkao 11 || Bolton, England || Decision || 5 || 3:00 ||
|-
! style=background:white colspan=9 | 
|- 
|-  style="background:#cfc;"
| 2014-09-05 || Win ||align=left| Sagetdao Petpayathai || Lumpinee Stadium || Bangkok, Thailand || Decision || 5 || 3:00 ||
|-
! style=background:white colspan=9 | 
|-
|-  style="background:#fbb;"
| 2014-08-14 || Loss ||align=left| Nong-O Kaiyanghadaogym || Rajadamnern Stadium || Bangkok, Thailand || Decision || 5 || 3:00 || 
|-  style="background:#cfc;"
| 2014-07-16 || Win ||align=left| Nong-O Kaiyanghadaogym || Rajadamnern Stadium || Bangkok, Thailand || Decision || 5 || 3:00 ||
|-  style="background:#cfc;"
| 2014-06-14 || Win ||align=left| Yetkin Özkul || Monte Carlo Fighting Masters 2014 || Monte Carlo, Monaco || Decision || 5 || 3:00 ||
|-  style="background:#cfc;"
| 2014-06-06 || Win ||align=left| Jos Mendonca ||  || Macao, China || Decision || 5 || 3:00 ||
|-
! style=background:white colspan=9 |
|-
|-  style="background:#cfc;"
| 2014-05-02|| Win ||align=left| Saeksan Or. Kwanmuang || Lumpinee Stadium || Bangkok, Thailand || Decision || 5 || 3:00 || 
|-  style="background:#fbb;"
| 2014-04-04 || Loss ||align=left| Saeksan Or. Kwanmuang || Songkla Southern Thailand || Thailand || Decision || 5 || 3:00 || 
|-  style="background:#cfc;"
| 2014-02-28 || Win ||align=left| Singdam Kiatmoo9 || Lumpinee Stadium || Bangkok, Thailand || Decision || 5 || 3:00 ||
|-
! style=background:white colspan=9 | 
|-  style="background:#fbb;"
| 2014-01-07 || Loss ||align=left| Petchboonchu FA Group || Lumpinee Stadium || Bangkok, Thailand || Decision || 5 || 3:00 ||
|-  style="background:#cfc;"
| 2013-12-05 || Win ||align=left| Kongsak sitboonmee || Lumpinee Stadium || Bangkok, Thailand || Decision || 5 || 3:00 || 
|-  style="background:#cfc;"
|-
! style=background:white colspan=9 |
|-  style="background:#cfc;"
| 2013-11-06 || Win ||align=left| Jomthong Chuwattana || Rajadamnern Stadium || Bangkok, Thailand || Decision || 5 || 3:00 ||
|-  bgcolor="#c5d2ea"
|-  style="background:#cfc;"
| 2013-10-08 || Win ||align=left| Petpanomrung Kiatmuu9  || Lumpinee Stadium || Bangkok, Thailand || Decision || 5 || 3:00 ||
|-  bgcolor="#c5d2ea"
| 2013-09-11 || Draw ||align=left|  Nong-O Kaiyanghadaogym || Rajadamnern Stadium || Bangkok, Thailand || Decision draw || 5 || 3:00 ||
|-  style="background:#cfc;"
| 2013-08-05|| Win ||align=left| Penake Sitnumnoi || Rajadamnern Stadium || Bangkok, Thailand || Decision || 5 || 3:00 ||
|-  style="background:#cfc;"
| 2013-07-09 || Win ||align=left| Sagetdao Petpayathai || Lumpinee Stadium || Bangkok, Thailand || Decision || 5 || 3:00 || 
|-  style="background:#fbb;"
| 2013-06-03 || Loss ||align=left| Penake Sitnumnoi || Rajadamnern Stadium || Bangkok, Thailand || Decision || 5 || 3:00 || 
|-  style="background:#fbb;"
|-  style="background:#c5d2ea;"
| 2013-05-03 || Draw ||align=left| Nong-O Kaiyanghadaogym || Lumpinee Stadium || Bangkok, Thailand || Decision Draw || 5 || 3:00 ||
|-  style="background:#fbb;"
| 2013-04-05 || Loss ||align=left| Diesellek Aoodonmuang || Lumpinee Stadium || Bangkok, Thailand || Decision || 5 || 3:00 ||
|-  style="background:#cfc;"
| 2013-02-21 || Win ||align=left| Petek Kiatyongyut || Rajadamnern Stadium || Bangkok, Thailand || Decision|| 5 || 3:00 ||
|-  style="background:#cfc;"
| 2012-12-24|| Win ||align=left| Kongpet Lukboonmee || Rajadamnern Stadium || Bangkok, Thailand || Decision || 5 || 3:00 ||
|-  style="background:#cfc;"
| 2012-11-30|| Win ||align=left| Kongsiam Tor Pitakchai || Lumpinee Stadium || Bangkok, Thailand || KO(Knees to the body)|| 4|| 3:00 ||
|- style="background:#fbb;"
| 2012-11-10 || Loss ||align=left| Saenchai PKSaenchaimuaythaigym || Super Showdown 4 || Glasgow, Scotland || Decision || 5 || 3:00 || 
|-  bgcolor="#c5d2ea"
| 2012-09-12 || Draw ||align=left|  Yodwicha Por Boonsit || Rajadamnern Stadium || Bangkok, Thailand || Decision draw || 5 || 3:00 ||
|-  style="background:#cfc;"
| 2012-05-17|| Win ||align=left| Mongkolchai Kwaitonggym || Rajadamnern Stadium || Bangkok, Thailand || Decision || 5 || 3:00 ||
|-  style="background:#cfc;"
| 2012-02-28 || Win ||align=left| Kongsak sitboonmee || Lumpinee Stadium || Bangkok, Thailand || Decision || 5 || 3:00 ||
|-  style="background:#cfc;"
| 2012-01-26 || Win ||align=left| Kongsak sitboonmee || Rajadamnern Stadium || Bangkok, Thailand || Decision || 5 || 3:00 ||
|-  style="background:#fbb;"
| 2011-12-22 || Loss ||align=left| Wanchalerm Uddonmuang || Rajadamnern Stadium || Bangkok, Thailand || Decision || 5 || 3:00 ||
|-  style="background:#cfc;"
| 2011-08-18 || Win ||align=left| Jomthong Chuwattana || Rajadamnern Stadium || Bangkok, Thailand || Decision || 5 || 3:00 || 
|-  style="background:#fbb;"
| 2011-03-15 || Loss ||align=left| Kongsak sitboonmee  || Lumpinee Stadium || Bangkok, Thailand || Decision || 5 || 3:00 ||
|-  style="background:#cfc;"
| 2011-01-20 || Win ||align=left| Singtongnoi Por.Telakun || Rajadamnern Stadium || Bangkok, Thailand || TKO (Punches) || 2 || ||
|-  style="background:#cfc;"
| 2010-12-16 || Win ||align=left| Noppakrit Kor Kampanart || Rajadamnern Stadium || Bangkok, Thailand || Decision || 5 || 3:00 ||
|-  style="background:#cfc;"
| 2010-11-02 || Win ||align=left| Jomthong Chuwattana || Rajadamnern Stadium || Bangkok, Thailand || Decision || 5 || 3:00 ||
|-  style="background:#fbb;"
| 2010-10-05 || Loss ||align=left| Nong-O Kaiyanghadaogym || Rajadamnern Stadium || Bangkok, Thailand || Decision || 5 || 3:00 ||
|-  style="background:#cfc;"
| 2010-09-03 || Win ||align=left| Sittisak Petpayathai || Lumpinee Stadium || Bangkok, Thailand || Decision || 5 || 3:00 ||
|-  style="background:#cfc;"
| 2010-08-04 || Win ||align=left| Pinsiam Sor.Amnuaysirichoke || Rajadamnern Stadium || Bangkok, Thailand || Decision || 5 || 3:00 ||
|-  style="background:#cfc;"
| 2010-06-10 || Win ||align=left| Pornsanae Sitmonchai || Rajadamnern Stadium || Bangkok, Thailand || Decision || 5 || 3:00 ||
|-  style="background:#fbb;"
| 2010-05-07 || Loss ||align=left| Sam-A Kaiyanghadaogym || Lumpinee Stadium || Bangkok, Thailand || Decision || 5 || 3:00 ||
|-  style="background:#cfc;"
| 2010-03-05 || Win ||align=left| Pornsanae Sitmonchai || Lumpinee Stadium || Bangkok, Thailand || Decision || 5 || 3:00 ||
|-  style="background:#c5d2ea;"
| 2010-02-11 || Draw ||align=left| Noppakrit Kor Kampanart || Rajadamnern Stadium || Bangkok, Thailand || Decision || 5 || 3:00 ||
|-  style="background:#cfc;"
| 2009-12-21 || Win ||align=left| Pettawee Sor Kittichai || Rajadamnern Stadium || Bangkok, Thailand || Decision || 5 || 3:00 || 
|-  style="background:#cfc;"
| 2009-11-26 || Win ||align=left| Khaimukkao Sit Or || Rajadamnern Stadium || Bangkok, Thailand || Decision || 5 || 3:00 || 
|-  style="background:#fbb;"
| 2009-10-08 || Loss ||align=left| Pettawee Sor Kittichai || Rajadamnern Stadium || Bangkok, Thailand || KO (Elbow) || 3 || || 
|-  style="background:#cfc;"
| 2009-09-10 || Win ||align=left| Thong Puideenaidee || Rajadamnern Stadium || Bangkok, Thailand || Decision || 5 || 3:00 || 
|-  style="background:#cfc;"
| 2009-08-06 || Win ||align=left| Rungruanglek Lukprabat || Rajadamnern Stadium || Bangkok, Thailand || Decision || 5 || 3:00 || 
|-  style="background:#fbb;"
| 2009-07-03 || Loss ||align=left| Sam-A Kaiyanghadaogym || Lumpinee Stadium || Bangkok, Thailand || Decision || 5 || 3:00 || 
|-  style="background:#fbb;"
| 2009-06-08 || Loss ||align=left| Singtongnoi Por.Telakun || Rajadamnern Stadium || Bangkok, Thailand || Decision || 5 || 3:00 || 
|-  style="background:#cfc;"
| 2009-05-07 || Win ||align=left| Pettawee Sor Kittichai || Rajadamnern Stadium || Bangkok, Thailand || Decision || 5 || 3:00 || 
|-  style="background:#c5d2ea;"
| 2009-03-26 || Draw||align=left| Pettawee Sor Kittichai || Rajadamnern Stadium || Bangkok, Thailand || Decision || 5 || 3:00 || 
|-  style="background:#cfc;"
| 2009-02-26 || Win ||align=left| Luknimit Singklongsi || Rajadamnern Stadium || Bangkok, Thailand || Decision || 5 || 3:00 || 
|-  style="background:#cfc;"
| 2009-01-14 || Win ||align=left| Thong Puideenaidee || Rajadamnern Stadium || Bangkok, Thailand || Decision || 5 || 3:00 || 
|-  style="background:#cfc;"
| 2008-11-27 || Win ||align=left| Thongchai Tor. Silachai || Rajadamnern Stadium || Bangkok, Thailand || Decision || 5 || 3:00 || 
|-  style="background:#fbb;"
| 2008-11-06 || Loss ||align=left| Chatchainoi Sitbenjama || Rajadamnern Stadium || Bangkok, Thailand || Decision || 5 || 3:00 || 
|-  style="background:#fbb;"
| 2008-10-09 || Loss ||align=left| Chatchainoi Sitbenjama || Rajadamnern Stadium || Bangkok, Thailand || Decision || 5 || 3:00 || 
|-  style="background:#fbb;"
| 2008-09-18 || Loss ||align=left| Chatchainoi Sitbenjama || Rajadamnern Stadium || Bangkok, Thailand || Decision || 5 || 3:00 || 
|-  style="background:#cfc;"
| 2008-08-07 || Win ||align=left| Khaimukkdam Sit Or || Rajadamnern Stadium || Bangkok, Thailand || TKO || 5 || || 
|-  style="background:#cfc;"
| 2008-07-10 || Win ||align=left| Khaimukkdam Sit Or || Rajadamnern Stadium || Bangkok, Thailand || Decision || 5 || 3:00 || 
|-  style="background:#cfc;"
| 2008-06-19 || Win ||align=left| Luknimit Singklongsi || Rajadamnern Stadium || Bangkok, Thailand || Decision || 5 || 3:00 || 
|-  style="background:#cfc;"
| 2008-05-01 || Win ||align=left| Kwanpichit Hor Pattanachai || Rajadamnern Stadium || Bangkok, Thailand || Decision || 5 || 3:00 || 
|-  style="background:#cfc;"
| 2008-03-26 || Win ||align=left| Hualampong NP Gym || Rajadamnern Stadium || Bangkok, Thailand || Decision || 5 || 3:00 || 
|-  style="background:#cfc;"
| 2008-01-30 || Win ||align=left| Harnchai Kiatyongyut || Rajadamnern Stadium || Bangkok, Thailand || Decision || 5 || 3:00 || 
|-  style="background:#cfc;"
| 2007-07-04 || Win ||align=left| Palangpon Piriyanoppachai|| Rajadamnern Stadium || Bangkok, Thailand || Decision || 5 || 3:00 || 
|-  style="background:#fbb;"
| 2007-06-07 || Loss ||align=left| Palangpon Piriyanoppachai || Rajadamnern Stadium || Bangkok, Thailand || Decision || 5 || 3:00 || 
|-  style="background:#cfc;"
| 2007-05-05 || Win ||align=left| Palangpon Piriyanoppachai|| Rajadamnern Stadium || Bangkok, Thailand || Decision || 5 || 3:00 || 
|-  style="background:#cfc;"
| 2007-04-12 || Win ||align=left| Yodprabsuk Por Kumpai || Rajadamnern Stadium || Bangkok, Thailand || Decision || 5 || 3:00 || 
|-  style="background:#fbb;"
| 2007-02-14 || Loss ||align=left| Sudoatadee Deatrat || Rajadamnern Stadium || Bangkok, Thailand || Decision || 5 || 3:00 || 
|-  style="background:#cfc;"
| 2007-01-22 || Win ||align=left| Weruburuathai Saksomchai || Rajadamnern Stadium || Bangkok, Thailand || TKO || 3 || || 
|-  style="background:#cfc;"
| 2006-10-28 || Win ||align=left| Sudpatadee Deatrat ||  || Bangkok, Thailand || Decision || 5 || 3:00 || 
|-  style="background:#cfc;"
| 2006-08-14 || Win ||align=left| Sudpatadee Deatrat || Rajadamnern Stadium || Bangkok, Thailand || Decision || 5 || 3:00 || 
|-  style="background:#cfc;"
| 2006-07-20 || Win ||align=left| Tee US Petrungsan || Rajadamnern Stadium || Bangkok, Thailand || Decision || 5 || 3:00 || 
|-  style="background:#cfc;"
| 2006-05-29 || Win ||align=left| Payaklak Sitsingthongnoi || Rajadamnern Stadium || Bangkok, Thailand || Decision || 5 || 3:00 || 
|-  style="background:#cfc;"
| 2006-04-06 || Win ||align=left| Naka Kaewsamrit || Rajadamnern Stadium || Bangkok, Thailand || Decision || 5 || 3:00 || 
|-  style="background:#fbb;"
| 2006-03-06 || Loss ||align=left| Naka Kaewsamrit || Rajadamnern Stadium || Bangkok, Thailand || Decision || 5 || 3:00 || 
|-  style="background:#fbb;"
| 2006-01-30 || Loss ||align=left| Palangchok Por Pitaksuntirath || Rajadamnern Stadium || Bangkok, Thailand || Decision || 5 || 3:00 || 
|-
| colspan=9 | Legend:

Lethwei record

|- style="background:#fbb;"
| 2019-12-29 || Loss || align="left" | Soe Lin Oo || Myanmar vs. Thailand Challenge Fights || Hpa-an, Myanmar || KO (Headbutt) || 3 || 
|-
| colspan=9 | Legend:

References

Pakorn P.K. Saenchai Muaythaigym
Pakorn P.K. Saenchai Muaythaigym
1990 births
Living people
Pakorn P.K. Saenchai Muaythaigym